Lupin the 3rd Part IV: The Italian Adventure, also known simply as , is the fifth incarnation of TMS Entertainment's long-running anime television adaptation of Lupin III manga. The series received its world premiere in Italy on August 30, 2015 on the Italia 1 and Italia 1 HD channels, and a preview screening at Concordia theater in San Marino on August 29, 2015. The Japanese premiere was on October 1, 2015 on NTV and the series was made available on the J:Com and Hulu services in Japan on October 21. It ran for 26 episodes in Italy and 24 episodes in Japan. The opening theme for the Italian version of the series, "Lupin, un ladro in vacanza" (Lupin, a thief on holiday) is performed by Italian talent show hip-hop singer Moreno featuring Italian anime and cartoons themes veteran Giorgio Vanni. The opening theme for the Japanese version of the series "Theme from Lupin III 2015" is composed by Yuji Ohno and performed by You & The Explosion Band. The ending theme for the Japanese version of the series  is performed by Enka singer Sayuri Ishikawa and features lyrics written by Tsunku. It was released as a single with additional tracks in Japan on October 1, 2015. The series has been licensed by Anime Limited for the UK market and by Discotek Media for the North American market. The dub, which was directed by Richard Epcar and Ellyn Stern, started airing in the United States on Adult Swim's Toonami programming block started on June 18, 2017 and concluded on January 21, 2018.


Episode list

Home media release

Japanese

English

See also

 Lupin III
 List of Lupin the Third Part I episodes
 List of Lupin the Third Part II episodes
 List of Lupin the Third Part III episodes
 List of Lupin the Third: The Woman Called Fujiko Mine episodes
 List of Lupin the 3rd Part V: Misadventures in France episodes
 List of Lupin the 3rd Part 6 episodes
 List of Lupin III television specials

References

Lupin the 3rd Part IV: The Italian Adventure
Lupin the 3rd Part IV: The Italian Adventure